Rachel Louise Williams (born 10 January 1988) is an English professional footballer who plays as a forward for Manchester United of the English Women's Super League.

Before rejoining Birmingham City in May 2017, Williams spent 2 years at Notts County Ladies, one year at Chelsea Ladies and three years at her first spell at Birmingham City, where she was converted from an attacking midfielder to a striker. Williams made her senior England debut in July 2009 but had to wait two years for her next appearance, missing out on selection for Women's Euro 2009 and the 2011 Women's World Cup. She was selected in the Great Britain squad for the 2012 London Olympics.

Club career

Williams joined Leicester City Women as a twelve–year–old, progressing through their centre of excellence to play in their senior side. She was vice–captain as the side won the County League in 2005. and the following season was a member of the side that again won the County League, but also the County Cup. In the 2006–07 season, Williams was a member of the Leicester side that won the treble of the East Midlands Women's Premier League title, the County Cup and the League Cup and promotion to the Midlands Combination League. The following season she was part of the Leicester team that won promotion to the FA Women's Premier League Northern Division.

She left Leicester at the end of the 2007–08 season to join Doncaster Rovers Belles. She was the FA Premier League player of the month for October 2008, and was a member of the Doncaster side that lost to Arsenal Ladies in the 2009 FA Women's Premier League Cup final. She ended her first season with Doncaster as the club's Player of the Year and the Players' Player of the Year.

Williams netted on the opening day of the 2009–10 season as Doncaster drew 1–1 at home to Blackburn Rovers Ladies. In October 2009 she scored against former club Leicester City Women as Doncaster progressed in the Premier League Cup.

With Doncaster not playing until the FA WSL in March 2011, Williams re–signed for Leicester City in summer 2010. In December 2010, Williams was revealed to have signed for Birmingham City's FA WSL squad. After converting to a striker, Williams made an impressive start to the new season with Birmingham, scoring five goals in her first two WSL appearances and winning a recall to the England squad.

Williams hit 14 goals in 14 games as Birmingham missed out on the WSL title on the final day. She was also voted 2011 Players' Player of the Year at The FA Women's Football Awards. She scored an injury time equaliser against Chelsea Ladies in the 2012 FA Women's Cup Final, which Birmingham eventually won after a penalty shootout.

In October 2013 Birmingham announced that Williams had departed the club "by mutual consent". A transfer to Chelsea was made public on 6 November 2013. She scored seven goals in 13 games across all competitions for Chelsea, who finished second in the 2014 FA WSL. In January 2015 she transferred to Notts County Ladies in her native Midlands.  Following the closure of Notts County Ladies before the 2017 Spring Series, Williams re-signed to Birmingham City in May 2017.

In July 2022, Williams signed a two-year contract with Manchester United, reuniting with her former Birmingham manager Marc Skinner.

International career

England
Williams scored on her England Under-19 debut, whilst still an Under-17 player, against Switzerland in 2005. Later that year she was selected as part of the England squad for the UEFA Women's Under-19 Championship.

In May 2009, Williams was one of the first 17 female players to be given central contracts by the Football Association. At the time she was the only uncapped player to be awarded a contract. Her debut for the England senior side came in July 2009 when she came on as a substitute for Alex Scott in the 2–0 defeat at home to Iceland. She missed out on a place in the Women's Euro 2009 Squad, but was picked by head coach Hope Powell for England's squad to face Malta in the first qualifying game for the 2011 Women's World Cup. Despite excellent form at club level, Williams was overlooked for the 2011 World Cup squad.

Williams collected her second cap, more than two years after her first, when she replaced Natasha Dowie during half–time of a 2–2 Euro 2013 qualifying draw in Serbia. She scored her first international goal in the next qualifier against Slovenia, a 4–0 win at Swindon's County Ground in September 2011. In June 2013 Williams was left out of Powell's squad for UEFA Women's Euro 2013.

International goals
Scores and results list England's goal tally first.

Great Britain Olympic
In June 2012 Williams was named in the 18–player Great Britain squad for the 2012 London Olympics.

Personal life
Williams also works as a plasterer.

Honours 
Leicester City
 Midland Combination Women's Football League: 2007–08

 Unison East Midlands Women's Premier League: 2006–07
 Unison East Midlands Premier League Cup: 2006–07
 Unison East Midlands Southern League Cup: 2005–06
 Leicestershire & Rutland County FA Cup: 2005–06, 2006–07, 2007–08
 Leicestershire County League: 2004–05

Birmingham City

 Women's FA Cup: 2011–12

Individual

 WSL Goal of the Month: January 2023

 FA Women's Players' Player of the Year: 2010–11
 Women's Super League Golden Boot: 2010–11
 FA WSL All Star Team: 2010–11

 Doncaster Player of the Year: 2008–09
 Doncaster Players' Player of the Year: 2008–09

References

External links

Rachel Williams at The Football Association website

1988 births
Living people
English women's footballers
Footballers from Leicester
Doncaster Rovers Belles L.F.C. players
Birmingham City W.F.C. players
Chelsea F.C. Women players
England women's international footballers
FA Women's National League players
Women's Super League players
Footballers at the 2012 Summer Olympics
Olympic footballers of Great Britain
England women's under-23 international footballers
Notts County L.F.C. players
Leicester City W.F.C. players
Women's association football midfielders
Women's association football forwards
Tottenham Hotspur F.C. Women players